The 2007 South American Artistic Gymnastics Championships were held in Villavicencio, Colombia, October 10–14, 2007. The competition was organized by the Colombian Gymnastics Federation.

Medalists

Medal table

References

2007 in gymnastics
Artistic Gymnastics,2007
International gymnastics competitions hosted by Colombia
2007 in Colombian sport